Donald Moye, Jr. (born  May 23, 1946), known as Famoudou Don Moye, is an American jazz percussionist and drummer. He is most known for his involvement with the Art Ensemble of Chicago and is noted for his mastery of African and Caribbean percussion instruments and rhythmic techniques.

Early life and education 
Moye was born in Rochester, New York, United States, and performed in various drum and bugle corps (including the Rochester Crusaders) during his youth, as well as church choir. Moye has commented that he really "didn't have an affinity for the bugle… and just kind of gravitated towards drums." He also took violin lessons during this time. Moye was exposed to jazz at an early age since his mother worked for a local social club, that had a jazz club next door, which hosted musicians such as Kenny Burrell and Jimmy McGriff. His family was also musically inclined; his uncles played saxophones and his father played drums. Also, his mother used to take him to various performances as a child, such as "opera under the stars" and to see Mahalia Jackson.

Career

Moye went on to study percussion at Wayne State University in Detroit, Michigan. Moye lived in a building with trumpeter Charles Moore, who became his mentor.  Moye also played in the groups African Cultural Ensemble, which included musicians from African countries such as Ghana, and Detroit Free Jazz, which was Moore's band. It was at this time that he first encountered the Association for the Advancement of Creative Musicians (AACM) due to the revolving door of musicians in and out of Moore’s residence. In early 1968, Moore’s band traveled to Europe and Moye decided to live there for the next couple of years, touring and visiting the continent as well as Northern Africa.

Art Ensemble of Chicago and The Leaders 
By 1969, the AEC had become a quartet of Roscoe Mitchell, Joseph Jarman (saxophones), Lester Bowie (trumpet) and Malachi Favors Maghostut (bass), with no full-time drummer though all the musicians doubled on various percussion instruments. The group crossed the Atlantic Ocean and arrived in Europe to perform throughout the continent. Moye at the time was rehearsing and performing in Paris, France, at the American Center for Students and Artists, where musicians such as Art Taylor and Johnny Griffin practiced collectively. When Mitchell met with Moye again at the Center, he asked Moye to join his group, which was already known as the Art Ensemble of Chicago, and had issued several recordings, including three releases on the European label BYG Actual. These recordings did feature percussion but all percussion was played by Mitchell, Bowie, Favors, or Jarman.

After Moye returned to the States in the early 1970s, he played with the Black Artists Group in St. Louis, Missouri before settling in the Chicago, Illinois area. He was also in a duo with fellow percussionist Steve McCall who later was a member of Air with Henry Threadgil while still playing with the AEC. In the mid-1980s, Moye joined The Leaders, a jazz group consisting of AEC member Bowie, Chico Freeman, Arthur Blythe, Cecil McBee, and Kirk Lightsey. Moye has also recorded numerous solo albums as leader of his own band. Moye toured and recorded again with the AEC in the 1990s, which was dealt a blow with the 1999 death of Bowie. Moye refers to his own style of drumming as "Sun Percussion". Other groups he led in the 1990s include the Joseph Jarman/Famoudou Don Moye Magic Triangle Band and the Sun Percussion Summit (with Enoch Williamson), the latter of which was "a group dedicated to exploring the traditions of African-American percussion music."

Recognition 
 Downbeat International Critics Poll Winner – 1977, 1978, 1982
 New York Jazz Poll – 1979, 1980
 National Endowment for the Arts grants – 1974, 1981

Discography

As leader or co-leader
 1975 Sun Percussion, Vol. 1 – AECO
 1981 Black Paladins – Black Saint
 1983 Jam for Your Life! – AECO
 1985 Cassava Balls – Praxis
 1987 The African Tapes, Volume 1 – Praxis
 1988 The African Tapes, Volume 2 – Praxis
 1996 Afrikan Song with Enoch Williamson – AECO
 1998 Ancestral Memories: From Afrika to Chicago – Il Manifesto
 2002 A Symphony of Cities with Tatsu Aoki – Southport
 2002 Bamako Chicago Express (Live in Longiano) – Il Manifesto

With the Art Ensemble of Chicago

With The Leaders
Mudfoot (Black-Hawk, 1986)
Out Here Like This (Black Saint, 1987)
Heaven Dance (Sunnyside, 1988) as The Leaders Trio
Unforeseen Blessings (Black Saint, 1988)
Slipping and Sliding (Sound Hills, 1994)

As sideman
With Hamiet Bluiett
Resolution (Black Saint, 1977)
With Kenny Clarke, Andrew Cyrille, and Milford Graves
Pieces of Time (Soul Note, 1984)
With Chico Freeman
No Time Left (Black Saint, 1979)
Spirit Sensitive (India Navigation, 1979)
With Julius Hemphill
Raw Materials and Residuals (Black Saint, 1977)
With Joseph Jarman
The Magic Triangle (Black Saint, 1979) with Don Pullen
Earth Passage - Density (Black Saint, 1981)
With Oliver Lake
 Ntu: Point from Which Creation Begins (Freedom, 1976)
With Cecil McBee
Music from the Source (Enja, 1978)
Compassion (Enja, 1979)
Alternate Spaces (India Navigation, 1979)
With Marcello Melis
Angedras (Black Saint, 1983)
With Don Pullen
Milano Strut (Black Saint, 1978)
With Alan Silva
Seasons (BYG, 1971)
With Sirone
 Artistry (Of The Cosmos, 1979)
With Wadada Leo Smith
Spiritual Dimensions (Cuneiform, 2009)
With Randy Weston
Carnival (Freedom, 1974)

References

External links
 Official website
 Listing at the Art Ensemble of Chicago webpage
 

1946 births
Living people
Avant-garde jazz musicians
American jazz drummers
American jazz percussionists
Wayne State University alumni
Art Ensemble of Chicago members
20th-century American drummers
American male drummers
20th-century American male musicians
American male jazz musicians
The Leaders members
Leo Records artists